This is a list of adult state prisons in Louisiana. It does not include federal prisons or parish jails located in the state of Louisiana. The Louisiana Department of Public Safety & Corrections directly operates all except two.
 Allen Correctional Center
 Avoyelles Correctional Center - As of 2012, the state planned to privatize Avoyelles
 B. B. Rayburn Correctional Center
 David Wade Correctional Center
 Dixon Correctional Institute
 Elayn Hunt Correctional Center
 Louisiana Correctional Institute for Women
 Louisiana State Penitentiary, also known as Angola Prison
 Winn Correctional Center (private)

Other Facilities Occupied With DOC
 Nelson Coleman Correction Center
 Plaquemines Parish Detention Center

Former facilities:
 C. Paul Phelps Correctional Center (Closed 2012)
 Forcht-Wade Correctional Center (closed July 2012) 
 J. Levy Dabadie Correctional Center (closed July 2012)
 Steve Hoyle Rehabilitation Center - Now located in the Bossier Parish Correctional Center.

References

External links

Map of Louisiana Correctional Facilities

Louisiana
Prisons